William Bryson "Budget" Seaman (c. 1875 – April 18, 1910) was an American football and baseball player and coach. He served as the head football coach at Waynesburg College by—now known as Waynesburg University–in 1897, Washington & Jefferson College from 1900 to 1904, and Western Reserve University—now known as Case Western Reserve University—from 1906 to 1909. His Western Reserve team won two Ohio Athletic Conference titles, in 1907 and 1908, during his four-year tenure.

Seaman played college football as a guard at Washington & Jefferson in 1895 and 1896. He began his coaching career in 1897 at Waynesburg.

As a baseball manager of the Washington Senators in the Pennsylvania–Ohio–Maryland League for its only two seasons, he posted records of 57–44 in 1906—enough for league runner-up—and 45–75 in 1907.

Seaman was to remain the Western Reserve football coach for the 1910 season. However, he caught pneumonia in April 1910 and died in his hometown of Washington, Pennsylvania.

Head coaching record

Football

References

Year of birth missing
1910 deaths
19th-century players of American football
American football guards
Case Western Spartans football coaches
Minor league baseball managers
Waynesburg Yellow Jackets football coaches
Washington & Jefferson Presidents football coaches
Washington & Jefferson Presidents football players
People from Washington, Pennsylvania
Deaths from pneumonia in Pennsylvania